The Book of Tobit, also known as the Book of Tobias or the Book of Tobi, is a 3rd or early 2nd century BC Jewish work describing how God tests the faithful, responds to prayers, and protects the covenant community (i.e., the Israelites). It tells the story of two Israelite families, that of the blind Tobit in Nineveh and of the abandoned Sarah in Ecbatana. Tobit's son Tobias is sent to retrieve ten silver talents that Tobit once left in Rages, a town in Media; guided and aided by the angel Raphael he arrives in Ecbatana, where he meets Sarah. A demon named Asmodeus has fallen in love with her and kills anyone she intends to marry, but with the aid of Raphael the demon is exorcised and Tobias and Sarah marry,  after which they return to Nineveh where Tobit is cured of his blindness.

The book is included in the Catholic and Eastern Orthodox canons but not in the Jewish; the Protestant tradition places it in the Apocrypha, with Anabaptists, Lutherans, Anglicans and Methodists recognising it as useful for purposes of edification and liturgy, albeit non-canonical in status. The vast majority of scholars recognize it as a work of fiction with some historical references.

Structure and summary

The book has 14 chapters, forming three major narrative sections framed by a prologue and epilogue:
Prologue (1:1–2)
Situation in Nineveh and Ecbatana (1:3–3:17)
Tobias's journey (4:1–12:22)
Tobit's song of praise and his death (13:1–14:2)
Epilogue (14:3–15)

(Summarised from Benedikt Otzen, "Tobit and Judith").

The prologue tells the reader that this is the story of Tobit of the tribe of Naphtali, deported from Tishbe in Galilee to Nineveh by the Assyrians. He has always kept the laws of Moses, and brought offerings to the Temple in Jerusalem before the catastrophe of the Assyrian conquest. The narrative highlights his marriage to Anna, and they have a son named Tobias.

Tobit, a pious man, buries dead Israelites, but one evening while he sleeps he is blinded by a bird which defecates in his eyes. He becomes dependent on his wife, but accuses her of stealing and prays for death. Meanwhile, his relative Sarah, living in far-off Ecbatana, also prays for death, for the demon Asmodeus has killed her suitors on their wedding nights and she is accused of having caused their deaths.

God hears their prayers and the archangel Raphael is sent to help them. Tobias is sent to recover money from a relative, and Raphael, in human disguise, offers to accompany him. On the way they catch a fish in the Tigris, and Raphael tells Tobias that the burnt heart and liver can drive out demons and the gall can cure blindness. They arrive in Ecbatana and meet Sarah, and as Raphael has predicted the demon is driven out.

Tobias and Sarah are married, Tobias grows wealthy, and they return to Nineveh (Assyria) where Tobit and Anna await them. Tobit's blindness is cured, and Raphael departs after admonishing Tobit and Tobias to bless God and declare his deeds to the people (the Israelites), to pray and fast, and to give alms. Tobit praises God, who has punished his people with exile but will show them mercy and rebuild the Temple if they turn to him.

In the epilogue Tobit tells Tobias that Nineveh will be destroyed as an example of wickedness; likewise Israel will be rendered desolate and the Temple will be destroyed, but Israel and the Temple will be restored; therefore Tobias should leave Nineveh, and he and his children should live in righteousness.

Significance
Tobit is a work of fiction with some historical references, combining prayers, ethical exhortation, humour and adventure with elements drawn from folklore, wisdom tale, travel story, romance and comedy. It offered the diaspora (the Jews in exile) guidance on how to retain Jewish identity, and its message was that God tests his people's faith, hears their prayers, and redeems the covenant community (i.e., the Jews). 

Readings from the book are used in the Latin liturgical rites of the Catholic Church. Because of the book's praise for the purity of marriage, it is often read during weddings in many rites. Doctrinally, the book is cited for its teaching on the intercession of angels, filial piety, tithing and almsgiving, and reverence for the dead. Tobit is also made reference to in chapter 5 of 1 Meqabyan, a book considered canonical in the Ethiopian Orthodox Tewahedo Church.

Composition and manuscripts

The story in the Book of Tobit is set in the 8th century BC, but the book itself dates from between 225 and 175 BC. No scholarly consensus exists on the place of composition ("almost every region of the ancient world seems to be a candidate"); a Mesopotamian origin seems logical given that the story takes place in Assyria and Persia and it mentions the Persian demon "aeshma daeva", rendered "Asmodeus", but it contains significant errors in geographical detail (such as the distance from Ecbatana to Rhages and their topography), and arguments against and in favor of Judean or Egyptian composition also exist.

Tobit exists in two Greek versions, one (Sinaiticus) longer than the other (Vaticanus and Alexandrinus). Aramaic and Hebrew fragments of Tobit (four Aramaic, one Hebrew – it is not clear which was the original language) found among the Dead Sea Scrolls at Qumran tend to align more closely with the longer or Sinaiticus version, which has formed the basis of most English translations in recent times.

The Vulgate places Tobit, Judith and Esther after the historical books (after Nehemiah). Some manuscripts of the Greek version place them after the wisdom writings.

Canonical status

Those Jewish books found in the Septuagint but not in the standard Masoretic canon of the Jewish Bible are called the deuterocanon, meaning "second canon". Catholic and Orthodox Christianity include it in the Biblical canon. As Protestants follow the Masoretic canon, they therefore do not include Tobit in their standard canon, but do recognise it in the category of deuterocanonical books called the apocrypha.

The Book of Tobit is listed as a canonical book by the Council of Rome (AD 382), the Council of Hippo (AD 393), the Council of Carthage (397) and (AD 419), the Council of Florence (1442) and finally the Council of Trent (1546), and is part of the canon of both the Catholic Church and Eastern Orthodox Churches. Catholics refer to it as deuterocanonical.

Augustine (c. AD 397) and Pope Innocent I (AD 405) affirmed Tobit as part of the Old Testament Canon. Athanasius (AD 367) mentioned that certain other books, including the book of Tobit, while not being part of the Canon, "were appointed by the Fathers to be read". 

According to Rufinus of Aquileia (c. AD 400) the book of Tobit and other deuterocanonical books were not called Canonical but Ecclesiastical books.

Protestant traditions place the book of Tobit in an intertestamental section called Apocrypha. In Anabaptism, the book of Tobit is quoted liturgically during Amish weddings, with "the book of Tobit as the basis for the wedding sermon." The Luther Bible holds Tobit as part of the "Apocrypha, that is, books which are not held equal to the sacred Scriptures, and nevertheless are useful to read". Luther's personal view was that even if it were "all made up, then it is indeed a very beautiful, wholesome and useful fiction or drama by a gifted poet" and that "this book is useful and good for us Christians to read." Article VI of the Thirty-Nine Articles of the Church of England lists it as a book of the "Apocrypha". The first Methodist liturgical book, The Sunday Service of the Methodists, employs verses from Tobit in the Eucharistic liturgy. Scripture readings from the Apocrypha are included in the lectionaries of the Lutheran Churches and the Anglican Churches, among other denominations using the Revised Common Lectionary, though alternate Old Testament readings are provided. Liturgically, the Catholic and Anglican churches may use a scripture reading from the Book of Tobit in services of Holy Matrimony. 

Tobit contains some interesting evidence of the early evolution of the Jewish canon, referring to two rather than three divisions, the Law of Moses (i.e. the torah) and the prophets. For unknown reasons it is not included in the Hebrew Bible, although four Aramaic and one Hebrew fragment were found among the Dead Sea Scrolls indicating an authoritative status among at least some Jewish sects.  Proposed explanations have included its age (this is now considered unlikely), literary quality, a supposed Samaritan origin, or an infringement of ritual law, in that it depicts the marriage contract between Tobias and his bride as written by her father rather than her groom. Alternatively, allusions to fallen angels and its thematic connections with works such as 1 Enoch and Jubilees may have disqualified it from canonicity.  It is, however, found in the Greek Jewish writings (the Septuagint), from which it was adopted into the Christian canon by the end of the 4th century.

Influence
Tobit's place in the Christian canon allowed it to influence theology, art and culture in Europe. It was often dealt with by the early Church fathers, and the motif of Tobias and the fish (the fish being a symbol of Christ) was extremely popular in both art and theology. Particularly noteworthy in this connection are the works of Rembrandt, who, despite belonging to the Dutch Reformed Church, was responsible for a series of paintings and drawings illustrating episodes from the book.

Scholarship on folkloristics (for instance, Stith Thompson, Dov Noy, Heda Jason and Gédeon Huet) recognizes the Book of Tobit as containing an early incarnation of the story of The Grateful Dead, albeit with an angel as the hero's helper, instead of the spirit of a dead man.

Image gallery

See also
 Mary Untier of Knots (painting with Tobias and the Angel)
 Tobias and the Angel (Verrocchio)
 Philosopher in Meditation ("Tobit and Anna in an Interior" by Rembrandt)

Notes

References

Citations

Bibliography

External links

Book of Tobit in Hebrew and English, from Sefaria
 Book of Tobit from St. Takla Haymanot's Coptic Orthodox website in English (also available in Arabic)
 
  Various versions
 

 
3rd-century BC books
2nd-century BC books
Aramaic texts
Ancient Hebrew texts
Wisdom literature
Jewish apocrypha
Historical books